David Kuraoka (born 1946) is an American ceramic artist.  He was born in Lihue, Hawaii, grew up on the island of Kauai, Hawaii in Hanamaulu and Lihue, and graduated from Kauai High School in 1964. Kuraoka spent his formative years in Hanamaulu where he lived with his parents in his paternal grandmother's home in a plantation labor camp. His father, one of seven children and the only son, became a journalist, writing a weekly column published on Wednesdays, and the Kauai campaign manager for local politician Hiram Fong and Richard Nixon. His mother, Emiko Kuraoka, was a school teacher. He is married to Carol Kuraoka. Kuraoka moved to California in 1964 to study architecture at San Jose City College, eventually transferring to San José State University (San Jose, California) where he received his BA in 1970 and MA 1971. After completing graduate work that focused on ceramics, Kuraoka joined the faculty at San Francisco State University, eventually rising to head its ceramics department.

At the age of 35 he was named a Living Treasures of Hawai'i.

Now retired as professor of art and head of the ceramics department of San Francisco State University, Kuraoka maintains studios in both San Francisco and Kauai, Hawaii.

David Kuraoka said in an artist's statement, "My work is abstract, and my style is simple, clean and crisp."  He is best known for large ceramic pieces that are first thrown on a wheel, then further shaped by hand, burnished, covered with rock salt and copper carbonate, and fired in an open pit. He also makes more traditionally shaped ceramics with grayish-green celadon glaze and has begun having some of his organically shaped ceramic pieces cast in bronze, which are patinated to resemble his ceramics.  Hanakapi'ai 3, in the collection of the Hawaii State Art Museum, is an example of his bronze sculptures. Kuraoka has also created wall murals.

Works 

 Echo, The Contemporary Museum At First Hawaiian Center, Honolulu, Hawaii, 2006
Hanakapi'ai 3, Hawaii State Art Museum, Honolulu, Hawaii, 2003
Kumulipo (pit fired ceramic wall installation), Hawaii Convention Center, Honolulu, Hawaii, 1997

Known Collections 

 College of San Mateo (San Mateo County, California)
 Honolulu Museum of Art (Honolulu, Hawaii)
 Hawaii State Art Museum (Honolulu, Hawaii)
 Kauai Museum (Lihue, Hawaii)
 White House Art Collection (Washington, D. C.)
 Rotterdam Modern Museum of Art
 Tokyo Metropolitan Teien Art Museum
 Utah State University

Exhibitions 

 Honolulu Museum of Art First Hawaiian Center, Honolulu, Hawaii (2012, 2016)
 Honolulu Academy of Arts, Honolulu, Hawaii (2002, 2006)

References
 Chang, Gordon H., Mark Dean Johnson, Paul J. Karlstrom & Sharon Spain, Asian American Art, a History, 1850-1970, Stanford University Press, pp 364–365
 Hartwell, Patricia L. (editor), Retrospective 1967-1987, Hawaii State Foundation on Culture and the Arts, Honolulu, Hawaii, 1987, p. 97
 International Art Society of Hawai'i, Kuilima Kākou, Hawai’i-Japan Joint Exhibition, Honolulu, International Art Society of Hawai'i, 2004, p. 26
 Morse, Marcia and Allison Wong, 10 Years: The Contemporary Museum at First Hawaiian Center, The Contemporary Museum, Honolulu, 2006, p. 68
 Praag, Judith van, Living Treasure: David Kuraoka, International Examiner, November 17, 2004.
 Wong, Allison, 10 Years - The Contemporary Museum at First Hawaiian Center - Tenth Anniversary Exhibition, The Contemporary Museum, Honolulu, Hawaii, 2006, p. 68
 Yoshihara, Lisa A., Collective Visions, 1967-1997, An Exhibition Celebrating the 30th Anniversary of the State Foundation on Culture and the Arts, Art in Public Places Program, Presented at the Honolulu Museum of Art, September 3-October 12, 1997, Honolulu, State Foundation on Culture and the Arts, 1997, p. 88.
Saville, Jennifer, Island Shadows: Recent Work in Clay and Bronze by David Kuraoka, Honolulu Museum of Art, Honolulu, 2006, p. 8
Long Story Short with Leslie Wilcox David Kuraoka, PBS Hawaii, Honolulu, HI, 2018

Footnotes

Modern sculptors
American artists of Japanese descent
People from Lihue, Hawaii
People from Kauai County, Hawaii
San Jose State University alumni
San Francisco State University faculty
20th-century American ceramists
21st-century ceramists
1946 births
Living people
Sculptors from Hawaii
Ceramists from Hawaii
20th-century American sculptors
20th-century American male artists
American male sculptors